Natuna Malay (Base Melayu Natuna) is a variety of Malay language spoken by the people of Natuna Islands and its surroundings. Natuna Malay has similarities with Terengganu Malay, because the first ruler of Natuna, Datuk Kaya is said to be a descendant of the Pattani Sultanate which previously controlled the northern Malay Peninsula (Kelantan and Terengganu).

Phonemes
In Natuna Malay there are several sound changes phonemes, including the phonemes vowels /a/, /i/, /u/, /e/, /ǝ/, and /o/. Phonemes sound change consonants /r/, /p/, /l/, /t/, /k/, /f/, /v/ and /c/. Changes in the sound of the vowel phoneme /a/ with the diphthong phonemes /ᴐw/. consonant phonemes reduction /h/, /k/, /y/, /n/, /r/, /s/ and vowels phonemes reduction /o/.

Dialects
Natuna Malay is divided into several dialects, including;
Arung Ayam
Ceruk
Kampung Hilir
Midai
Pulau Laut
Ranai
Pulau Tiga
Sedanau
Serasan
Subi Besar
Subi Kecil

References

Austronesian languages
Malay language
Languages of Indonesia
Natuna Regency